Air BC was a Canadian regional airline headquartered in Richmond, British Columbia, Canada. It later became part of Air Canada Jazz.  This regional airline primarily flew turboprop aircraft but also operated jets as well as an Air Canada Connector carrier on behalf of Air Canada via a code share feeder agreement.

History 

Air BC was established in 1980 after the merger (by the Jim Pattison Group) of a number of west coast domestic airlines: Calumet Air Service, Canadian Air Transit, Flight Operation, Gulf Air Aviation, Haida Airlines, Island Airlines, Omineca Air Services, Pacific Coast Air Services and West Coast Air Services. A combined fleet emerged, including STOL capable de Havilland Canada DHC-6 Twin Otters with some Twin Otters being operated as float planes. In 1983, STOL capable DHC-7 Dash 7 turboprop aircraft were delivered and then in 1986 DHC-8 Dash 8-100 turboprops were acquired.

In 1987, Air Canada purchased 85% of Air BC, and Air BC became an Air Canada regional partner operating as Air Canada Connector. Air BC entered the jet age in 1988 with British Aerospace BAe 146-200 aircraft which was the only jetliner type ever operated by the air carrier.  In 1994, the airline was operating British Aerospace Jetstream 31 propjets as part of their Air Canada Connector code share feeder services.  Stretched DHC-8 Dash 8-300 turboprop aircraft were introduced as well. In March 1995, Air Canada purchased the remaining shares of Air BC.

In January 2001, a newly merged carrier called Air Canada Regional Inc was established. A wholly owned subsidiary of Air Canada, this company combined the individual strengths of five regional airlines – Air BC, Air Nova, Air Ontario, Air Alliance and Canadian Regional Airlines. Consolidation of these five companies was completed in 2002 and was marked by the launch of a new name and brand:  Air Canada Jazz.

Destinations 
Air BC served the following destinations in the fall of 1991 in Canada and the U.S. according to the Air BC – Air Canada Connector November 3, 1991, system timetable route map; by 1999, Air BC had expanded its Air Canada Connector service and was flying BAe 146-200 jet service nonstop between Edmonton and Denver.

 Alberta
Calgary — Calgary International Airport
Edmonton — Edmonton International Airport
Fort McMurray — Fort McMurray International Airport
Grande Prairie — Grande Prairie Airport
Lethbridge — Lethbridge Airport
Lloydminster — Lloydminster Airport
Medicine Hat — Medicine Hat Airport
 British Columbia
Abbotsford — Abbotsford International Airport
Campbell River — Campbell River Airport
Castlegar — West Kootenay Regional Airport
Comox — Comox Valley Airport
Cranbrook — Cranbrook/Canadian Rockies International Airport
Dawson Creek — Dawson Creek Airport
Kamloops — Kamloops Airport
Kelowna — Kelowna International Airport
Nanaimo — Nanaimo Airport
Penticton — Penticton Regional Airport
Powell River — Powell River Airport
Prince George — Prince George Airport
Prince Rupert — Prince Rupert Airport
Quesnel — Quesnel Airport
Sandspit — Sandspit Airport
Terrace — Northwest Regional Airport Terrace-Kitimat
Vancouver — Vancouver International Airport
Victoria — Victoria International Airport
Williams Lake — Williams Lake Airport
 Manitoba
Winnipeg — Winnipeg James Armstrong Richardson International Airport
 Saskatchewan
Regina — Regina International Airport
Saskatoon — Saskatoon John G. Diefenbaker International Airport
 United States
Denver, CO — Denver International Airport
Las Vegas, NV — McCarran International Airport
Portland, OR — Portland International Airport
Seattle, WA — Seattle–Tacoma International Airport

Fleet
Some aircraft flown by Air BC included:
 British Aerospace BAe 146-200 – only jet aircraft type operated by Air BC
 British Aerospace BAe Jetstream 31
 Britten Norman BN-2A Islander
 de Havilland Canada DHC-6 Twin Otter
 de Havilland Canada DHC-7 Dash 7
 de Havilland Canada DHC-8-100 Dash 8 (series 100 standard version)
 de Havilland Canada DHC-8-300 Dash 8 (series 300 stretched version)

See also 
 List of defunct airlines of Canada

References

External links

Notice about Air Canada regional airlines merging (2001)

Air Canada
Defunct airlines of Canada
Canadian companies established in 1980
Canadian companies disestablished in 2002
Airlines established in 1980
Airlines disestablished in 2002
Companies based in Richmond, British Columbia
1980 establishments in British Columbia
2002 disestablishments in British Columbia
Former Star Alliance affiliate members
Defunct companies of British Columbia